Progress is a rural locality (a khutor) in Ayryumovskoye Rural Settlement of Giaginsky District, Adygea, Russia. The population was 911 as of 2018. There are 10 streets.

Geography 
Progress is located 14 km east of Giaginskaya (the district's administrative centre) by road. Obraztsovoye is the nearest rural locality.

References 

Rural localities in Giaginsky District